Clarbec is a commune in the Calvados department in the Normandy region in northwestern France.

Population

International relations
Clarbec is twinned with Veitshöchheim, Germany since 1995.

See also
Communes of the Calvados department

References

Communes of Calvados (department)
Calvados communes articles needing translation from French Wikipedia